Vaiuru is an associated commune on the island of Raivavae, in French Polynesia. According to the 2017 census, it had a population of 198 people.

References

Geography of the Austral Islands
Populated places in French Polynesia